Omorgus spatulatus is a species of hide beetle in the subfamily Omorginae.

References

spatulatus
Beetles described in 1962